Colin Morse (born 29 June 1955) is a former Australian rules footballer who played with Collingwood in the Victorian Football League (VFL).

Notes

External links 

1955 births
Australian rules footballers from Tasmania
Collingwood Football Club players
Latrobe Football Club players
Living people